Troway is a village in North East Derbyshire, England. Population details are included in the civil parish of Eckington.

The village is located in the Moss Valley, on both banks of the Troway Brook and its tributary the Vale Brook. The Troway Brook flows into The Moss near the hamlets of Birley Hay and Ford. In 2007, some major damage to houses in Troway was caused after the Troway Brook burst its banks.

The village is located  West of Eckington,  East of Coal Aston, and  South of Gleadless.

Troway used to be home to small quarries, but they closed several years ago. Most people who live in Troway now work in Sheffield.

References

Villages in Derbyshire
Eckington, Derbyshire